Kristin M. Corrado (born June 24, 1965) is an American Republican Party politician who represents the 40th Legislative District in the New Jersey Senate. She was sworn into office on October 5, 2017. Before her appointment to the New Jersey Senate she served a Passaic County Clerk for seven years.

Personal and early life 
A resident of Totowa, New Jersey for her entire life, Corrado attended St. James School before moving on to Paul VI High School. Corrado attended East Stroudsburg University of Pennsylvania and is a graduate of Seton Hall University School of Law. First elected as Passaic County Clerk in 2009, Corrado was re-elected for a second five-year term in 2014.

New Jersey Senate 
Corrado was appointed fill the seat left by former Senator Kevin J. O'Toole, who had resigned from office on July 1, 2017, to become a commissioner of the Port Authority of New York and New Jersey.

In early 2018 Corrado led a fight to block Governor Phil Murphy's nomination of Assemblywoman Elizabeth Maher Muoio to be Secretary of Treasury, questioning Muoio's lack of experience in issues related to her proposed position.

Corrado sponsored a bill alongside Senators Paul Sarlo, Gerald Cardinale, Loretta Weinberg, and Joseph Lagana that would push a special election to the following year if a vacancy for the County Sheriff, Clerk, or Surrogate posts if the vacancy occurs 70 days before election day.

Committee assignments 
Environment and Energy
Health, Human Services, and Senior Citizens
Judiciary

District 40 
Each of the 40 districts in the New Jersey Legislature has one representative in the New Jersey Senate and two members in the New Jersey General Assembly. The representatives from the 40th District for the 2022—23 Legislative Session are:
 Senator Kristin Corrado (R)
 Assemblyman Christopher DePhillips (R)
 Assemblyman Kevin J. Rooney (R)

Electoral history

New Jersey Senate

2017 
With the retirement and eventual resignation of Kevin J. O'Toole, Corrado was appointed and sworn into his senate seat on October 5, 2017, making her the incumbent in the general election. Democrats ran Thomas Duch. Despite Democrats doing very well statewide and Thomas Duch doing much better than the Democratic nominee against O'Toole in 2013, Corrado still won by 12 points. She won all counties in the district.

Passaic County Clerk

2014 
Corrado ran for re-election as county clerk in 2014. She beat Democratic nominee Jeffery Gardner by a little over 1,000 votes.

2009 
In 2009, incumbent Clerk Karen Brown retired instead of running for a second term. The Democratic nominee was Keith Kazmark, who lost to Corrado by over 3,000 votes.

References

External links
Senator Corrado's Official Site
Senator Corrado's Legislative Website, New Jersey Legislature

1965 births
Living people
East Stroudsburg University of Pennsylvania alumni
New Jersey lawyers
New Jersey Republicans
Republican Party New Jersey state senators
People from Totowa, New Jersey
Politicians from Passaic County, New Jersey
Seton Hall University School of Law alumni
21st-century American politicians